The 2022 Copa Libertadores final stages were played from 28 June to 29 October 2022. A total of 16 teams competed in the final stages to decide the champions of the 2022 Copa Libertadores, with the final played in Guayaquil, Ecuador at Estadio Monumental Isidro Romero Carbo.

Qualified teams
The winners and runners-up of each of the eight groups in the group stage advanced to the round of 16.

Seeding

Starting from the round of 16, the teams were seeded according to their results in the group stage, with the group winners (Pot 1) seeded 1–8, and the group runners-up (Pot 2) seeded 9–16.

Format

Starting from the round of 16, the teams played a single-elimination tournament with the following rules:
In the round of 16, quarter-finals and semi-finals, each tie was played on a home-and-away two-legged basis, with the higher-seeded team hosting the second leg (Regulations Article 2.2.3.2). If tied on aggregate, extra time was not played, and a penalty shoot-out was used to determine the winners (Regulations Article 2.4.3).
The final was played as a single match at a venue pre-selected by CONMEBOL, with the higher-seeded team designated as the "home" team for administrative purposes (Regulations Article 2.2.3.5). If tied after regulation, 30 minutes of extra time would be played. If still tied after extra time, a penalty shoot-out would be used to determine the winners (Regulations Article 2.4.4).

Draw

The draw for the round of 16 was held on 27 May 2022, 12:00 PYT (UTC−4) at the CONMEBOL Convention Center in Luque, Paraguay. For the round of 16, the 16 teams were drawn into eight ties (A–H) between a group winner (Pot 1) and a group runner-up (Pot 2), with the group winners hosting the second leg. Teams from the same association or the same group could be drawn into the same tie (Regulations Article 2.2.3.2).

Bracket
The bracket starting from the round of 16 is determined as follows:

The bracket was decided based on the round of 16 draw, which was held on 27 May 2022.

Round of 16
The first legs were played on 28–30 June, and the second legs were played on 5–7 July 2022.

|}

Match A

Athletico Paranaense won 3–2 on aggregate and advanced to the quarter-finals (Match S1).

Match B

Flamengo won 8–1 on aggregate and advanced to the quarter-finals (Match S2).

Match C

Vélez Sarsfield won 1–0 on aggregate and advanced to the quarter-finals (Match S3).

Match D

Atlético Mineiro won 2–1 on aggregate and advanced to the quarter-finals (Match S4).

Match E

Palmeiras won 8–0 on aggregate and advanced to the quarter-finals (Match S4).

Match F

Talleres won 3–1 on aggregate and advanced to the quarter-finals (Match S3).

Match G

Tied 0–0 on aggregate, Corinthians won on penalties and advanced to the quarter-finals (Match S2).

Match H

Estudiantes won 4–1 on aggregate and advanced to the quarter-finals (Match S1).

Quarter-finals
The first legs were played on 2–4 August, and the second legs were played on 9–11 August 2022.

|}

Match S1

Athletico Paranaense won 1–0 on aggregate and advanced to the semi-finals (Match F1).

Match S2

Flamengo won 3–0 on aggregate and advanced to the semi-finals (Match F2).

Match S3

Vélez Sarsfield won 4–2 on aggregate and advanced to the semi-finals (Match F2).

Match S4

Tied 2–2 on aggregate, Palmeiras won on penalties and advanced to the semi-finals (Match F1).

Semi-finals
The first legs were played on 30 and 31 August, and the second legs were played on 6 and 7 September 2022.

|}

Match F1

Athletico Paranaense won 3–2 on aggregate and advanced to the final.

Match F2

Flamengo won 6–1 on aggregate and advanced to the final.

Final

The final was played on 29 October 2022 at Estadio Monumental Isidro Romero Carbo in Guayaquil.

Notes

References

External links
CONMEBOL Libertadores 2022, CONMEBOL.com

3
June 2022 sports events in South America
July 2022 sports events in South America
August 2022 sports events in South America
September 2022 sports events in South America
October 2022 sports events in South America